Dungarvan was a parliamentary constituency in Ireland, which from 1801 to 1885 returned one Member of Parliament (MP) to the House of Commons of the Parliament of the United Kingdom.

The constituency was created when the Union of Great Britain and Ireland took effect on 1 January 1801, replacing the earlier Dungarvan constituency in the Parliament of Ireland.

Boundaries
This constituency was the parliamentary borough of Dungarvan in County Waterford. Until the Parliamentary Boundaries (Ireland) Act 1832 (passed alongside the Representation of the People (Ireland) Act 1832) it was coterminous with the manor of Dungarvan, and the franchise was exercised by potwallopers of the town and forty shilling freeholders of the manor. The manor extended far beyond the urban area, including Abbeyside on the east bank of the Colligan River.  Commissioners appointed in 1831 and 1836, to revise Irish parliamentary and municipal borough boundaries respectively, described the old border as "supposed to contain about 10,000 Statute Acres" and with an "ill defined" boundary. Besides the main portion around the town, the borough included three detached townlands further west (Knockampoor, Canty, and Ballymullala) and excluded 15 small enclaves (one within Dungarvan town, one to the west, and thirteen on the east bank of the Colligan, of which nine belonged to the manor of Dromana, including the townlands of Tournore, Clonanagh and Croughtanaul). Although the 1832 commissioners suggested radical simplification in the boundary, the only change in 1832 was to exclude the detached parts and include the enclosed enclaves to create a single area. This boundary is marked on the Ordnance Survey of Ireland's six-inch map, published a few years later.

Members of Parliament

Elections

Elections in the 1830s

Lamb's death caused a by-election.

Jacob was unseated on petition, causing a further by-election.

O'Loghlen was appointed as Solicitor-General for Ireland, causing a by-election.

O'Loghlen was appointed as Attorney-General for Ireland, causing a by-election.

O'Loghlen was appointed Baron of the Irish Court of Exchequer and resigned, causing a by-election.

Elections in the 1840s

Sheil was appointed as Master of the Mint, requiring a by-election.

Elections in the 1850s
Due to both ill health and to become a diplomat in Tuscany, Sheil resigned by accepting the office of Steward of the Chiltern Hundreds, causing a by-election.

In order to enable the withdrawal of an election petition filed by O'Flaherty, Maguire resigned by accepting the office of Steward of the Chiltern Hundreds, causing a by-election.

Elections in the 1860s

Elections in the 1870s

O'Keefe's death caused a by-election.

Elections in the 1880s

Sources
The Parliaments of England by Henry Stooks Smith (1st edition published in three volumes 1844–50), 2nd edition edited (in one volume) by F.W.S. Craig (Political Reference Publications 1973)

References

Westminster constituencies in County Waterford (historic)
Constituencies of the Parliament of the United Kingdom established in 1801
Constituencies of the Parliament of the United Kingdom disestablished in 1885
Dungarvan